The Oriental Insurance Company Ltd. is an Indian public sector insurance company owned by the Government of India and administrated by the Ministry of Finance. Headquartered in New Delhi, the company has 29 regional offices and more than 1500 active branches across the country. It also has branches in Nepal, Kuwait, and Dubai. It offers more than 170 general insurance products. The IRDA registration number of the company is "556".

History
The Oriental Insurance Company Ltd. was incorporated at Mumbai on 12 September 1947. The company was a wholly owned subsidiary of The Oriental Government Security Life Assurance Company Ltd and was formed to carry out general insurance business. The company was a subsidiary of the Life Insurance Corporation of India from 1956 to 1973 (until the General Insurance Business was nationalized in the country). In 2003 all shares of the company held by the General Insurance Corporation of India were transferred to the central government.
 Oriental Insurance made a modest beginning with a first year premium of ₹99,946 in 1950. The goal of the company was “service to clients” and achievement thereof was helped by the strong traditions built up over time.

Oriental Insurance's head office is at New Delhi. It has 29 regional offices and nearly 1500+ operating offices in various cities of the country. The company has overseas operations in Nepal, Kuwait and Dubai and has a total strength of around 10,000 employees. From less than a lakh at its inception, the gross premium figure stood at ₹12,747 crores in FY 2020–21.

See also
MEDISEP

References

Financial services companies established in 1947
General insurance companies of India
Government-owned insurance companies of India
Companies nationalised by the Government of India
Indian brands